Sorotzkin is a surname. Notable people with the surname include:

Baruch Sorotzkin (1917–1979), American Haredi rabbi
Yitzchok Sorotzkin, American Orthodox rabbi
Zalman Sorotzkin (1881–1966), Lithuanian Orthodox rabbi

Sorotzkin may also refer to:
Unsdorf, a Jerusalem neighborhood also known as Sorotzkin, after its main street